Puerto Rico Ilustrado was a weekly magazine in Puerto Rico. It was published from 6 March 1910 through 27 December 1952 in San Juan, Puerto Rico, turning out 2,227 issues.  Several issues were also published in 1968, July 1970 to December 1970, and February 1973 to April 1973. For many years, Puerto Rico Ilustrado was delivered as an insert in El Mundo newspaper.

References

Cultural magazines published in the United States
History magazines published in the United States
Magazines established in 1910
Magazines disestablished in 1952
Magazines published in Puerto Rico
Spanish-language magazines
Weekly magazines published in the United States
Mass media in San Juan, Puerto Rico
Newspaper supplements
Defunct magazines published in the United States
1910 establishments in Puerto Rico
1952 disestablishments in Puerto Rico